Eparchy of Braničevo is one of the eparchies of the Serbian Orthodox Church, with the seat at Braničevo, Serbia. Since 1994, it is headed by bishop Ignatije Midić.

History
It is mentioned for the first time in 878 as a bishopric. It continues the early Christian seats of Viminacium and Horreum Margi. In 1018, the Bishopric is mentioned as part of the Eastern Orthodox Archbishopric of Ohrid with seat at Braničevo (at the ruins of ancient Viminacium, near Požarevac).

Since the end of 13th century, from the time of Serbian kings Stefan Dragutin and Stefan Milutin, the Eparchy was part of the Serbian Archbishopric. It gained the honorary status of Metropolitanate in 1346, within the Serbian Patriarchate of Peć.

The seat of the Metropolitanate was moved to Smederevo between 1430/1434 and 1439, and since then, the bishops hold the titles "of Smederevo". In 1705, the Smederevo Metropolitanate or old Braničevo Eparchy, became part of the Eparchy of Belgrade. It was resurrected in 1921 as "Eparchy of Braničevo", with seat in Požarevac.

Church-buildings

Heads
bishop of Braničevo - Agaton, 878
bishop of Braničevo - Blasius, 1202
bishop of Braničevo - Jacob, 13th century
bishop of Braničevo - Porphyr, 13th century
bishop of Braničevo - Ioanikie, 13th century
metropolitan of Braničevo - Venijamin, 1416
metropolitan of Braničevo - Savatije, 1434
metropolitan of Smederevo - Atanasije, 1439-1456
bishop of Smederevo - Jovan, 1466
metropolitan Pavle of Smederevo, around 1530
bishop of Braničevo - Mitrofan Rajić (1921—1930)
bishop of Braničevo - Jovan Ilić (1931—1933)
bishop of Braničevo - Venijamin Taušanović (1934—1959)
bishop of Braničevo - Hrizostom Vojinović (1959—1989)
bishop of Braničevo - Sava Andrić (1991—1993)
bishop of Braničevo - Ignatije Midić, 1994- (current)

References

Sabornost.org (Homepage of Eparchy)
History of Serbian Orthodox Church, book 1

Bibliography

 
 
 
 
 
 
 
 

Serbian Orthodox Church in Serbia
Religious sees of the Serbian Orthodox Church
Braničevo District
Christian organizations established in the 14th century
Dioceses established in the 14th century
9th century in Serbia